Aqua Claudia ("the Claudian water") was an ancient Roman aqueduct that, like the Aqua Anio Novus, was begun by Emperor Caligula (37–41 AD) in 38 AD and finished by Emperor Claudius (41–54 AD) in 52 AD.

It was the eighth aqueduct to supply Rome and together with Aqua Anio Novus, Aqua Anio Vetus and Aqua Marcia, it is regarded as one of the "four great aqueducts of Rome".

Route

Its mainsprings, the Caeruleus and Curtius, were situated 300 paces to the left of the 38th milestone of the Via Sublacensis.

It is one of the two ancient aqueducts that flowed through the Porta Maggiore, the other being the Aqua Anio Novus. It is described in some detail by Frontinus in his work published in the later 1st century, De aquaeductu.

Nero extended the aqueduct with the Arcus Neroniani to the Caelian hill and Domitian further extended it to the Palatine, after which the Aqua Claudia could provide all 14 Roman districts with water. The section on the Caelian hill was called arcus Caelimontani.

Bridges 

Visible remaining bridges include the Ponte sul Fosso della Noce, Ponte San Antonio, Ponte delle Forme Rotte, Ponte dell`Inferno, Ponte Barucelli.

Ponte dell`Inferno 

The bridge has a single arch in opus quadratum, reinforced in the late period in brickwork. The specus (channel) is about 1 m wide and is also built in opus quadratum, but with a very porous stone which is locally found as a layer immediately above the tuff on which the bridge rests.

Ponte Barucelli 

The Ponte Barucelli (also known as Ponte Diruto) is made up of two monumental bridges 8 m apart for the aqua Claudia (to the north) the Anio Novus (to the south) to cross the Acqua Nera stream. Both date to between 38 and 52 AD. They were later strengthened with buttresses and reinforcements, becoming two huge continuous and connected structures.

The Anio Novus bridge, about 85 m long and about 10 m wide, has a few small arches except for the main high and narrow one for the Acqua Nera. It had originally been built of tuff in opus quadratum. In the second half of the 1st century it was reinforced in opus mixtum, visible at the two east end buttresses. At the beginning of the 3rd century nine rectangular buttresses were added at regular intervals on the north side while on the south side only three were added near the bed of the stream, later increased by five on the west bank in poor opus latericium and two on the east in opus mixtum.

Later the two bridges were connected by three brick arches and with buttresses.

Repairs
The aqueduct went through at least two major repairs. Tacitus suggests that the aqueduct was in use by AD 47. An inscription from Vespasian suggests that Aqua Claudia was used for ten years, then failed and was out of use for nine years. The first repair was done by Emperor Vespasian in 71 AD; it was repaired again in 81 AD by Emperor Titus.

Alexander Severus reinforced the arches of Nero (CIL VI.1259) where they are called arcus Caelimontani, including the line of arches across the valley between the Caelian and the Palatine.

The church of San Tommaso in Formis was later built into the side of the aqueduct.

Gallery

See also

List of aqueducts in the city of Rome
List of aqueducts in the Roman Empire
List of Roman aqueducts by date
Ancient Roman engineering
Ancient Roman technology

Notes

External links
Interactive map with the full Aqua Claudia
Map of Rome with Aqua Claudia running (red)
The Aqua Claudia Webpage
3D digital model of Rome featuring Aqua Claudia

Buildings and structures completed in the 1st century
Claudia
50s establishments in the Roman Empire
1st-century establishments in Italy
Claudius
Caligula
52 establishments